Chrysophyllum elegans may refer to:

Eudicots, asterids, order Ericales:
 Chrysophyllum elegans Raunk. ex Warm., a synonym for Chrysophyllum flexuosum, a tree (Sapotaceae) found in Brazil
 Chrysophyllum elegans (Vink) Baehni, a synonym for Pycnandra elegans, a tree (Sapotaceae) found in New Caledonia